Vivian Simpson may refer to:

 Vivian Simpson (politician) (1903–1977), politician in Northern Ireland
 Vivian Simpson (footballer) (1883–1918), English amateur football forward
 Vivian V. Simpson (1903–1987), American lawyer